Dumbría is a municipality of northwestern Spain in the province of A Coruña, in the autonomous community of Galicia. It belongs to the comarca of Fisterra. It had a population of 2983 inhabitants in 2019.

References

Municipalities in the Province of A Coruña